Polistes actaeon is a species of social paper wasp found in southern Brazil.

References

External links 
 Polistes actaeon at ZipcodeZoo

Hymenoptera of Europe
Hymenoptera of Asia
actaeon
Insects described in 1836